The Wright MPA Mk 1 was the first of two human-powered aircraft designed and built by Peter Wright, an engineer from Melton Mowbray, England.

Background 
Design of the aircraft began in October 1969, with construction itself beginning mid-1971. It was completed by February 1972, with that taking 500 hours. Wright's approach was to reduce the aircraft's weight and its construction time by minimising the amount of materials used to construct the aircraft. 

The aircraft was a mid-wing monoplane. The pilot sat in a semi-recumbent position, and powered a rear-mounted 2-bladed propeller via bicycle pedals driving a bicycle chain and driveshaft transmission. The framework for the pilot support and the transmission was made from mild steel tubing, with the remainder of the aircraft being constructed from expanded polystyrene, plastics, balsa, with carbon fibre being used to reinforce the structure.  Compared to other human-powered aircraft of the era, the MPA Mk 1 had a very large wing area, with a very low wing loading. This affected the number of opportunities available to undertake flights.  The aircraft was fitted with a tricycle undercarriage, with the front wheel being powered, and two small trailing wheels castering. The empennage was of a cruciform type, with an all-flying elevator and a conventional fin and rudder.  There was no lateral control.

The first flight was made at Langer airfield near Nottingham, in February 1972, when it covered 120 yards (110 metres) at an altitude of 1 ft (0.3 metres). When initially tested, the pilot had rudder control only, with the elevator being fixed, and the undercarriage adjusted to give the aircraft the correct incidence for take-off. Eventually, flights of up to 300 yards (275 metres) were made. In 1975, it was reported that the aircraft was in store, pending the availability of a suitable flying site.

Wright went onto design and produce a second human-powered aircraft, the Micron.

Specifications

See also

References

External links

Human-powered aircraft
Mid-wing aircraft
Pusher aircraft
Cruciform tail aircraft
Single-engined pusher aircraft
Aircraft first flown in 1972
1970s British experimental aircraft